Augustów Voivodeship was created in 1816 from the Łomża Department. Its capital was in Łomża until 1818, when it was transferred to Suwałki. In 1837 it was transformed into Augustów Governorate.

Administrative divisions
It was divided into 7 counties:
 Biebrzańsk County (seat in Szczuczyn)
 Dąbrowski County (seat in Lipsk, later in Augustów)
 Kalvarija County
 Łomża County
 Marijampolė County
 Tykociń County
 Wigierski-Sejny County (seat in Sejny)

Transportation
The Augustów Canal was built between 1823 and 1837 in the Augustów Voivodeship of the Kingdom of Poland. From the time it was first built, the canal was described by experts as a technological marvel, with 22 sluices and 18 locks contributing to its aesthetic appeal. It was the first summit level canal in Central Europe to provide a direct link between the two major rivers, Vistula River through the Biebrza River – a tributary of the Narew River, and the Neman River through its tributary – the Czarna Hancza River.

Voivodeships of the Congress Poland